The following outline is provided as an overview of and topical guide to interpersonal relationships.

Interpersonal relationship – association between two or more people; this association may be based on limerence, love, solidarity, regular business interactions, or some other type of social commitment. Interpersonal relationships are formed in the context of social, cultural, and other influences.

Essence of relationships 

 Social relations – relationship between two (i.e. a dyad), three (i.e. a triad) or more individuals (i.e. members of a social group). Social relations, derived from individual agency, form the basis of social structure.
 Social actions – acts which take into account the actions and reactions of individuals (or 'agents').  According to Max Weber, "an action is 'social' if the acting individual takes account of the behavior of others and is thereby oriented in its course" .

Types of relationships

Membership in a social group 

Social group – consists of two or more humans who interact with one another, share similar characteristics and collectively have a sense of unity. By this definition, a society can be viewed as a large group, though most social groups are considerably smaller.
 Dyad – group of two people. "Dyadic" is an adjective used to describe this type of communication/interaction. A dyad is the smallest possible social group.
 Triad – group of three people. They are more stable than a dyad. Reduces intense interaction and is based less on personal attachments and more on formal rules and regulations.

Household membership 

Household — one or more persons who share main residence, and share meals or living space
 Single person
 Family
 Single parent
 Nuclear family (immediate family)
 Spouse
 Husband
 Wife
 Parent
 Father
 Mother
 Step-father
 Step-mother
 Legal guardian
 Child
 Son
 Daughter
 Step-son
 Step-daughter
  Sibling
 Brother
 Sister
 Stepfamily
 Extended family
 Grandparent
 Grandfather
 Grandmother
 Grandson
 Granddaughter
 Uncle
 Aunt
 Cousin
 Nephew
 Niece
 Family-in-law
 Father-in-law
 Mother-in-law
 Brother-in-law
 Sister-in-law
 Kinship
 Consanguinity
 Affinity
 Fictive kinship
 Relation change
 Marriage
 Adoption
 Relation end
 Breakup
 Divorced
 Disownment
 Emancipation
 Widowhood
 Household aspects
 Caregiver
 Gender roles
 Household economics
 Breadwinner model

Peer group membership 
Peer group
 Special interest group –
 Pen pals –

Organization membership 
An organization is a social group which distributes tasks for a collective goal. There are a variety of legal types of organizations, including:

 Corporations –
 Governments –
 Non-governmental organizations –
 International organizations –
 Armed forces –
 Charitable organizations –
 Not-for-profit corporations –
 Partnerships –
 Cooperatives –
 Universities –

Community membership 

Community
 Citizenship – membership in a country or nation.
 Neighbor – member of a neighborhood.
 Member of society – a society is a body of individuals outlined by the bounds of functional interdependence, possibly comprising characteristics such as national or cultural identity, social solidarity, language, or hierarchical organization.

Intimate relationships 

Intimate relationship
 Cohabitation – living together without being married.
 Committed relationship – interpersonal relationship based upon a mutually agreed-upon commitment to one another involving exclusivity, honesty, trust or some other agreed-upon behavior. The term is most commonly used with informal relationships, such as "going steady", but may encompass any relationship where an expressed commitment is involved.
 Close friendship – being close friends
 Courtship
 Long-term relationship (LT —R)
 Monogamy – having a single long-term partner or marriage to one person.
 Polyamory – having multiple long-term lovers and/or partners.
 Polygamy – marriage to multiple partners.
 Polyandry – the marriage of a woman to multiple men.
 Polygyny –  the marriage of a man to multiple women.
 Polygynandry – the marriage of multiple men to multiple women.
 Free union
 Engagement or betrothal; the period of time between a marriage proposal and the marriage itself, sometimes accompanied by the formal Church announcement of the intent to marry known as banns.
 Marriage
 Marriage partners
 Husband
 Wife
 Types of marriage
 Arranged marriage
 Forced marriage
 Cousin marriage
 Open marriage
 Civil union
 Domestic partnership
 Boyfriend
 Girlfriend
 Familial relationship – relationship between members of a family. Family members tend to form close personal relationships.  See family section above.
 Friendship
 Extramarital affair
 Love–hate relationship
 Romantic friendship
 Relationship anarchy
 Casual relationship
 Female-led relationship – woman or wife led relationship (FLR)

Business and professional relationships 

 Employer-worker relationship
 Employer and employee
 Coworker 
 Contractor
 Customer
 Landlord and tenant

Other types of relationships 
 Conservatorship
 Enemy
 Frenemy – a person with whom an individual maintains a friendly interaction despite underlying conflict, possibly encompassing rivalry, mistrust, jealousy or competition.
 Godparents
 Mentorship
 Neighbor

Relations (relationship activities) 

 Conflict resolution –
 Human bonding –
 Interpersonal communication –
 Personal relationship skills –
 Relationship education –
 Social rejection –
 Wedding –

Relationship formation 

Human mating is the process whereby an individual seeks out another individual with the intention of forming a long-term intimate relationship or marriage, but sometimes for casual relationship or friendship.

 Personal advertisement –
 Meet market –
 Flirting –
 Pick-up line –
 Singles event  –
 Courtship –
 Dating –
 Internet dating –
 Going Dutch –
 Endogamy – the practice of marrying within a specific ethnic group, class, or social group, rejecting all others; in contrast to exogamy.
 Hypergamy – act or practice of seeking a spouse of higher socioeconomic status, or caste status than oneself; in contrast to hypogamy.

Sexual relations
 Human sexual activity –
 Sexual intercourse –
 Swinging –

Dysfunctional relations 
 Dysfunctional family –
 Relational transgression – violation of implicit or explicit relational rules.

Abusive relations 

Abuse
 Child abuse
 Elder abuse
 Dating abuse
 Domestic violence
 Emotional abuse
 Verbal abuse
 Gaslighting
 Financial abuse
 Infidelity – breach of the expectation of sexual exclusivity. Also called "cheating".
 Extramarital affair
 Adultery
 Extramarital sex
 Neglect
 Spousal abuse

End of a relationship 

 Breaking up –
 Divorce –
 Legal separation –
 Widowhood –

Reasons for ending a relationship 

 Dysfunctional relations – see Dysfunctional relations section above.
 Irreconcilable differences –
 Relational transgression – violation of implicit or explicit relational rules.

Theories of interpersonal relations 
 Socionics – theory of intertype relations incorporating Carl Jung's work on personality types with Antoni Kępiński's theory of information metabolism.
 Attachment theory – describes the dynamics of long-term relationships between humans. Its most important tenet is that an infant needs to develop a relationship with at least one primary caregiver for social and emotional development to occur normally.
 Social exchange theory – a social-psychological and sociological perspective that explains social change and stability as a process of negotiated exchanges between parties. Posits that human relationships are formed by a subjective cost-benefit analysis and the comparison of alternatives.
 Relational models theory – a psychological theory authored by Alan Fiske proposing four elementary forms of human relations.

Relationship characteristics 
Aspects of relationships include:
 Attachment in adults –
 Attachment in children –
 Interpersonal attraction – force acting between two people that tends to draw them together and resist their separation, which leads to friendships and romantic relationships. It is distinct from physical attraction.
 New relationship energy (NRE) – state of mind experienced at the beginning of most significant sexual and romantic relationships, typically involving heightened emotional and sexual receptivity and excitement.

Stages of a relationship 
 Stages presented in George Levinger's relationship model:
 Acquaintance
 Buildup
 Continuation
 Deterioration
 Termination

Feelings and emotions
 Love
 Familial love
 Parental love
 Marital love
 Brotherly love
 Filial piety
 Veneration
 Romance
 Infatuation
 Intimacy
 Jealousy
 Limerence
 Passion
 Platonic love
 Psychology of sexual monogamy
 Unconditional love

Sexual orientation 
 Bisexual
 Heterosexual
 Homosexual
 Asexual
 Pansexual

Romantic orientation 
 Aromanticism
 Homoromanticism
 Heteroromanticism
 Biromanticism
 Panromanticism

Relationship partners 
Terms for partners in intimate relationships include:

 Boyfriend/Girlfriend
 Confidant or confidante
 Family member
 Friend or Companion
 Life partner/Partner
 Spouse
 Mistress
 Soulmate
 Significant other
 Sexual partner

Relationship management 

 Bride price –
 Dower –
 Dowry –
 Brideservice –
 Love contract –

Relationship intervention 
 Family therapy –
 Relationship counseling –

Relationship development 
Terms for people who want to develop their relationships include:

 People skills –
 Communications training –
 Emotional intelligence –
 Emotional literacy –
 Social intelligence –
 Social skills –
 Socionics

Lacking an intimate relationship 

 Spinster –
 Celibate –

Romance and intimacy 

Courtship –

Romance –
 Pet names
 Interpersonal communication
 Face-to-face
 Love letter
 Telephone
 Internet romance
 Romanticism
 Poetry
 Drawing
 Painting
 Dating
 Cooking
 Couple dancing
 Movies
 Stargazing
 Serenade

Intimacy –
 Physical intimacy
 Touching
 Erogenous zones
 Cuddling
 Arm around shoulder
 Arms around abdomen 
 Head on shoulder
 Head on lap
 Hugging
 Eye contact
 Holding hands
 Kissing
 Nuzzling
 Emotional intimacy
 Love
 Acceptance
 Jealousy
 Empathy
 Sympathy
 Longing

Other 
 Emotional contagion – tendency to catch and feel emotions that are similar to and influenced by those of others.
 Casual relationship – sexual relationship without the extra commitments of a more formal romantic relationship.
 Relational disorder – mental disorder attributable to a relationship rather than to any one individual in the relationship.
 Emotional tyranny – 
 Equal power relationship – 
 Fear of commitment – 
 Friend zone – 
 Internet relationship – 
 Quality time – 
 Reciprocal liking – 
 Respect – 
 Sexual capital – 
 Term of endearment – 
 Roommate – 
 Interpersonal attraction – 
 Broken heart – 
 Long-distance relationship – 
 Marriage – a socially binding commitment to a partner
 Female-led relationship – romantic commitment where the woman is the lead and/or principle partner; often referred to as an FLR
 Sexual infidelity –  having a sexual relationship outside of a relationship that includes a commitment to have no other sexual partners
 Sexual fidelity –  not having other sexual partners other than one's committed partner, even temporarily
 Serial monogamy – having a series of monogamous relationships, one after the other
 Polyamory – encompasses a wide range of relationships, including those above: polyamorous relationships may include both committed and casual relationships
 Relationship anarchy – a theory that questions the idea of love as a special, limited feeling that is only real if it is restricted to two people only, at any given moment.
 Sexual promiscuity – having casual sexual partners at will (compare with chastity)
 Affection – 
 Casual dating – 
 Kiss – 
 Kissing traditions – 
 Emotional intimacy – 
 Female bonding – 
 Life partner – 
 Limbic resonance – 
 MHC in sexual mate selection –

See also 

 Outline of human sexuality

References 

Relationships
Relationships